Alexander Inn was a historic inn located near Swannanoa, Buncombe County, North Carolina.  The original section was built about 1820, and was a small log structure. With later expansions and additions, it became a rambling two-story log and frame structure.  It has been demolished.

It was listed on the National Register of Historic Places in 1984.

References

Hotel buildings on the National Register of Historic Places in North Carolina
Hotel buildings completed in 1820
Buildings and structures in Buncombe County, North Carolina
National Register of Historic Places in Buncombe County, North Carolina